Sixteen nations competed at the 2017 World Baseball Classic qualification.

Key

Qualifier 1

Manager  Jon Debble
Coaches Tony Harris

Manager  Chris Woodward
Coaches

Manager  Rick Magnante
Coaches Brian McAm

Manager  Tim Hulett
Coaches

Qualifier 2

Manager  Edgar Gonzalez
Coaches Nick Leyva

Manager  Mike Griffin
Coaches

Manager Garth Iorg
Coaches

Manager  Marvin Benard
Coaches Cairo Murillo

Qualifier 4

Manager  Barry Larkin
Coaches Tiago Caldeira

Manager  Liam Carroll
Coaches

Qualifier 3

Manager  (40) Luis Urueta
Coaches Jolbert Cabrera, (5) Jair Fernández, (33) Néder Horta, (44) Walter Miranda, (16) Édgar Rentería, (7) Luis Sierra

Manager  Liam Carroll
Coaches 

Rosters